The La Grande-3 or LG-3 is a hydroelectric dam on the La Grande River in northern Quebec, part of Hydro-Québec's James Bay Project. The station can generate 2,418 MW and was commissioned in 1982–1984. It generates electricity through the reservoir and dam system. The dam and reservoir both are named La Grande-3. The community of Sakami was founded for its construction.

See also 

 List of largest power stations in Canada
 Reservoirs and dams in Canada

External links 
 Hydro-Québec's La Grande Complex
 La Grande System
 La Grande-3

James Bay Project
Dams in Quebec
Dams completed in 1984
Dams on the La Grande River
Publicly owned dams in Canada